The Jermaghbyur Geothermal Power Plant will be Armenia's largest geothermal power plant having an installed electric capacity of 150 MW. It will be situated in Syunik Province of Armenia.

See also 

 Karkar Geothermal Power Plant

References 

Geothermal power stations in Armenia
Proposed geothermal power stations
Proposed renewable energy power stations in Armenia